The following is an episode list of the British television series Count Duckula produced by Cosgrove Hall Films for Thames Television. It was first shown on ITV during its CITV output on weekday afternoons. Four series were made comprising 65 episodes which aired between 6 September 1988 and 16 February 1993.

Series overview

Episodes

Series 1 (1988–89)

Series 2 (1989–90)

Series 3 (1990–91)

Series 4 (1993)
Thames Television ceased broadcasting on New Year's Eve 1992 to be replaced by Carlton Television. After 1992, Thames became an independent production company, making programmes commissioned from broadcasters. Although Thames Television produced the last seven episodes, it was still a requirement to have an ITV franchise to be allowed such programmes onto the ITV network. Thames Television for Carlton Television presented for ITV. David Jason was also busy filming the first series of A Touch of Frost in 1992, and was unavailable for some of that year. According to Brian Trueman, thirteen more episodes were scripted and recorded, but were never animated due to Thames Television's loss of the ITV licence.

When the third DVD boxset was released in the UK by FremantleMedia, the seven episodes which make up Series 4 were added to Series 3. All episodes that make up Series 4 were dated 1989.

External links
 

Lists of British children's television series episodes
Lists of British animated television series episodes